Italy is a country located in the south of Europe. The capital city is Rome. There are about 59 million people in Italy, and about 3.5 million Italians suffer from some form of hearing loss. Among them, around 70,000 people are severely deaf. The European Union for the Deaf reports that the majority of the deaf people in Italy use Italian Sign language (LIS). LIS has been an official sign language in Italy since 2021. Italy, among other countries, ratified the Convention on the Rights of Persons with Disabilities (CRPD) and is slowly improving conditions for deaf humans in Italy. Many major organizations in Italy fight for deaf rights and spread awareness to the Italian National Agency for the protection and assistance of the Deaf (ENS) and Associated Italian Families for the Defense of the Rights of Deaf and Hard of Hearing Individuals (FIADDA). Newborns in Italy also receive universal hearing screenings. Education in Italy is directed towards oralism although sign language is also used. LIS is a stable language and used by 10,000 to 1,000,000,000 users in Italy.

Language emergence 
Deaf people in Italy use Italian Sign Language (LIS). LIS is influenced by and shares similarities with French Sign Language. This happened because a deaf educator, Tommaso Silvestri, in 1784 brought over the French gesture system into Italy and started teaching it to children.

Italian Sign Language came to be through convergence. The deaf community in Italy lacked a form of communication and thus developed LIS through influences of French Sign Language. LIS can be quite different in various parts of Italy. For example, the signing of "shoes" is different regionally, and sometimes can be traced to a certain school. In particular, one school "Guilio Tarra" that was famous for its oralist education, signed "shoes" in a unique way "likely as the result of speech therapy sessions held at the school". LIS is best characterized as a deaf-community sign language as mostly only deaf people in Italy know LIS.

Significant organizations

Italian National Agency for the Deaf 

The Italian National Agency for the protection and assistance of the Deaf (ENS) was the result of the unification of the Federazione Italiana delle Associazioni per i Sordomuti (FIAS) and the Union Sordomuti Italiani(USI) established in 1932. They are a part of the World Federation of the Deaf and European Union of the Deaf. ENS operates with "103 provincial Sections, 21 Regional Councils and over 50 inter-munipal representations".

ENS was started by Antonio Magarotto. His son Cesare Magarotto created the World Federation of the Deaf. Antonio Magarotto was born in Italy and became deaf at three years old due to meningitis. He studied at the Piarist Fathers' T. Pendola Insitutue for the deaf. In 1932, Magaarotto and his friends formed the Italian National Agency for the Deaf where he served as president from 1932 to 1950. During his lifetime he devoted himself to becoming a voice for deaf students. He also founded in Padua the First National Institute of Middle and Higher Education for the Deaf. Magarotto also received an honorary doctorate in humanities from the Gallaudet University of Washing.

The members can vote and have governance roles. ENS also plans cultural and sport activities and events for all members. The local branches hold sign language courses. They also have training for interpreters in bigger cities as well as job finding aid. ENS is active on several social media platforms and also posts articles regarding their activity such as "ENS at the Congress of the Italian Linguistics Society".

Overall, ENS plays a big role in the deaf community by "promoting the integration of deaf people into society" as well as focusing in areas "such as legislation, education and employment. "

Mason Perkins Deafness Fund 

This organization fights to create a positive environment for deaf and deaf-blind children of Italy through promoting LIS and deaf culture. They are a non-profit organization founded in 1985 by Elena Radutzky, an American researcher who studied Italian Sign Language, through funding from Mason Perkins. MPDF creates and provides cultural events, educational material such as children books in LIS, training, networking events. This organization directed the Dictionary of Italian Sign Language (1992) and also broadened educational opportunities for Italian deaf students through scholarships.

Associated Italian Families for the Defense of the Rights of Deaf and Hard of Hearing Individuals (FIADDA) 

The association was started on May 6, 1991, and changed names over the years. The parents in this association focus on oralism for their deaf children as one of their fundamental values. They highly encourage integration through oralism because "a verbal language is much more useful and functional for the deaf person". They believe that sign language is not an official language and because of its variety in nature should be a second choice as compared to oralism. They also provide support for families with hard of hearing individuals. They do so by creating seminars and courses for schools focused on how to teach for rehabilitation oralism. The organization focuses on accessibility for deaf individuals in terms of having oralism resources and subtitles in media.

CODA (Children of Deaf Adults) Social Promotion Association 

This social promotion association was started in 2014 from wanting to "give recognition to hearing children of deaf parents" in Italy. The international CODA organization was started in 1983 by Millie Brother, a graduate of Gallaudet University and also a hearing CODA, in America. The idea was to create a space where children could meet others with similar experiences between translating LIS and speaking. Non-Codas are also welcome to join as supporting members but cannot be a voting member.

The organization is involved in various activities such as gatherings where they share experiences and management of relationships between deaf parents and children. They promote sign language through courses and activities along with research in collaboration with other associations and universities regarding relation dynamics of children of deaf adults. Over the summer they provide camp for deaf and hard of hearing CODA "to promote integration and inclusion" as well as scholarships for higher education. Overall the CODA association aims to share and explore their "bilingual-bicultural heritage".

GPODHH (Global Coalition of Parents of Children who are Deaf or Hard of Hearing) 

This coalition of parent groups from around the world was formed in 2008 in Como, Italy at the NHS 2008: Beyond Newborn Hearing Screening Conference by a small group of parents from the United States, Australia and Italy. They aim to improve the system and practices to encourage informed choice and the empowerment of families for deaf or hard of hearing children. There are several member organizations one of them being Dai Genitori ai Genitori in Italy. The association in Italy is mainly a blog page that was last updated in 2015. Other member organisations have websites that provide information to families whose children are deaf or hard of hearing in their respective countries. GPODHH provides the perspective of parents of children who are deaf or hard of hearing at a number of international forums including the World Hearing Forum, CIICA and are members of the Advisory Committee reviewing and updating the "Best Practices in Family-Centred Early Intervention for Children who are Deaf or Hard of Hearing: An International Consensus Statement".

Human/Civil rights

Official recognition of LIS 

Italian Sign Language was officially recognized by the Italian parliament on May 19, 2021, as part of a coronavirus relief bill that recognized, promotes, and would protect LIS and LISt (Italian Tactile Sign Language). This meant the official acknowledgement of LIS interpreters as professions and the spread of LIS in the government offices.

Convention on the Rights of Persons with Disabilities 

The UN Convention on the Rights of Persons with Disabilities is an agreement between countries and the United Nations to protect the rights of persons with disabilities. Italy ratified the CRPD on 15 May. Italy is also signed up for optional protocol meaning it will create structure for accountability to happen. Each country has to submit a report regarding how they are implementing the rights in the CRPD policy document. The UN will create a "list of issues" with civilian input that will be sent to Italy in which Italy responds to in the state party report. In the document "Info from Civil Society Organizations", the authors point out gaps in the State report as well as priorities and resolutions. This document was made by several organizations that fight for disability rights, including ENS and is part of the CRPD documents.

The first and last CRPD report submitted by Italy was one 21 January 2013 and it was due on 15 June 2011. Within the state report, Italy states in regard to DDH rights that they have acknowledged and promoted sign language in law 104/92 along with professional training of support teachers. However, the formal recognition of LIS is currently  still in process (report was submitted prior to the official recognition of LIS in 2021).

World Federation of the Deaf 

World Federation of the Deaf lists on its website important CRPD articles to DHH individuals It also lists goals that are important in order to increase human rights for deaf people.

Mentions in the state report specifically regarding deaf rights include:

 Article 21.b from the CPRD was acknowledged through article 21 of the constitution that gives freedom of expression "through oral words, written texts or any other instrument".
 The state report does mention that Law 244/07 has extended the exemption of payment of licence tax on mobile phones to deaf people.
 They also state that "full participation of deaf people in social life" is still in discussion in Parliament.
 As regards to having "reasonable accommodation in the workplace" the report says that although legally there is no obligation to have reasonable accommodations in Italy, article 2 of law 68/99 talks about issues regarding work environment and relations and "therefore can be considered as a form of reasonable accommodation".

CRPD Articles and Goals that were not mentioned in the state report:

 Article 2: makes clear that sign language are equal in status to spoken language.
 24.1: Requires the government to ensure inclusive education system at all levels.
 24.4: Requires teachers of deaf children to be qualified in sign language.
 Goal 4.5: eliminate gender disparities.
 Goal 11.2, 11.7: providing accessible transport and universal access to safe spaces.

Points made in regard to deaf rights from "Info from Civil Society Organizations":

 Lack of provision of reasonable accommodation in other areas of life other than employment.
 Make qualification of school staff include students with disabilities; persons with disabilities have lower level of education compared to general public.
 Article 24 education: state report does not mention if accessibility requirements are in schools of any level; how quality of education is assessed; how continuity of teaching is ensured; how enrollment of teachers with disabilities is promoted, not only allowed.
 Data collection on deaf people is through telephone interview which will cause data to be undermined.

Milan conference 

The Milan conference happened in Italy in 1880 during the Second International Congress on Education of the Deaf in Milan, where they banned the usage of sign language in schools. Out of 164 delegates only 1 delegate, James Denison, principal of Kendall School in Washington, DC, was deaf. This created a split in history of LIS. Prior to 1880, deaf children were educated using signs or received bilingual education meaning they would learn both LIS and varying degrees of written and oral. After the ban of sign language in 1880, schools strictly focused on oralism. This causes deaf teachers to lose their jobs and created a decrease in deaf professionals in Italy.

Sign Language was able to survive despite that ban because students were signing outside of school.

Early hearing detection and intervention

Detection 
In a nationwide survey done in 2018, 95.3% of newborns received hearing test. The universal newborn hearing screening has been mandatory in Tuscany, Italy since 2007. Over time, other regions also adopted these guidelines. Each region uses different methodologies and has different results. The guidelines have also been updated over the years.

The UNHS program in Tuscany and most regions is separated into 3 levels:

 public and private birth points that can do TEOAE testing (Transient Evoked Otoacoustic Emissions). This test can be done by trained nursing personnel, neonatologists and audiometrists.
 audiology services; usually in middle and large hospitals do TEOAE and Automated Auditory Brainstem Responses (A-ABR) and can be performed by pedia nurses, audiometrists, pediatricians, audiologists, otolaryngologists.
 Regional Reference Centres; can perform whole clinical and audiological evaluation in children including TEOAE, DPOAE (distortion product otoacoustic emissions) and ABR (Auditory Brainstem Responses) They can also do complete diagnosis of hearing loss and activation of habilitation for children.

According to the screening process designed by DASOE, all birth points must screen newborns during spontaneous sleep and before hospital discharge. Infants who pass will leave and infants who don't will be re-examined within the first month with TEOAE. If the result is still not passing the newborn will be sent to be tested at level 2 (audiology services) and if still not passing will be sent within the third month to level 3 (regional reference centre) for definitive diagnosis and start rehabilitation no later than sixth month of life. Infants who pass but have risk factors for late-onset hearing loss will be sent to level 2 centres and reassessed every 6–12 months for the first three years. Some risk factors include family history, syndromes that are associated with hearing loss, low birth weight, meningitis. Through surveys, it is still evident that many children are lost in between rescreening's.

Intervention 

After a child is diagnosed with hearing problems, there is not much support or protocol given. Counseling services are rare and professionals direct children towards oralist education. The Italian legislation encourages children to integrate into mainstream schools and sign language is not encouraged. However, there is some support available from the following organizations:

 FIADDA gives useful links and directions to Reference centers that are responsible for carrying out cochlear implants.
 Free batteries from Regional Council started in 2009 for hearing aids for Tuscan Citizens regardless of age or condition. Hearing aid repair also available by the Regional Council.
 Hearing loss desk provides information on hearing aid how to obtain communication and frequency in Prato by Fiadda Tuscany and ENS.
 FIADDA Toscana answers questions regarding to school support, applications, tax breaks, law services.
 Famiglie al Centro is a project by ENS and managed by European Union of the Deaf. The project's goal is to bring deaf youth closer to reading and to bring awareness of this topic among families. They have partnered with Huawei to make an app called storysign that translates children's books into LIS.

Language deprivation 
Language deprivation is the lack of consistent accessible language input in early years of life. In Italy, about 1 in 1000 people are affected by hearing loss. About 95% of deaf children are born to hearing families and about 5% are born to deaf parents. Hearing families often want their children to attend mainstream schools that encourage cochlear implants and integration. Almost all residential and special schools for the deaf are closed except for bilingual/bimodel experimental schools. Only a small number of deaf children have LIS as their first language and only deaf children of deaf parents are exposed to sign language since birth. Deaf children born into hearing families rarely have early access to sign language although they may acquire it later on.

In studies done regarding the impact of hearing aids and cochlear implants, it is evident that children who were able to be exposed to language had a significant change in language skills. Behavioral problems were also known to be a cause of language deprivation or poor language development as the lack of being able to understand and express led to interferences with emotions, social rules, and interactions. 30%-50% of profoundly hearing loss children with or without hearing aids exhibited behavorial problems. Children who had access to language through cochlear implants showed similar levels of behavioural problems to their normal hearing classmates.

Primary and secondary education 
Families with deaf children often have to move in order for their children to attend bilingual or deaf schools. There are bilingual/bimodel experimental programs that exist in Italy. Istituto Statale dei Sordi in Rome, Scuola per i'infanzia Statale in Cossato, and Istituto comprensivo Santini in Noventa Padovana are all examples of bilingual programs that are present in Italy. Bilingual curriculums use both Italian and LIS. LIS is also an individual class from 1 hour to a maximum of 6 hours per week. In places like Palermo, Guidonia, Cossato, LIS is a second language course for hearing students.

Deaf children who do not take part of special programs do not have automatic access to interpreters during school. They may only have access to a communication assistant and teachers who aren't guaranteed to know sign language. In cases where deaf children have a communication assistant/ TA who is competent in LIS, the child will receive individual explanations in LIS for 20 hours a week. However, the rest of the curriculum will be provided through spoken Italian. This is the case when there is only 1 deaf child in a class of hearing children.

The government provides support through three branches, the Second Teacher, the Communication Assistant, and speech therapy. The Second Teacher works like a translator within the school system, providing what the teacher is saying to the deaf student. Communication assistants work in the classroom as well as in homes and other services provided by the state. They work based on contracts and often overlap with Second Teachers. Speech therapy is offered by the country to families as well.

In order to qualify as a support teacher there is a required number of hours in LIS training by the Ministry for Public Instruction. There are also projects focused on training deaf people to become communication instructors. At nursery and elementary schools, the assistants working are often deaf.

Higher education 
According to a study done at the Institute for the Deaf of Turin the enrollment of deaf and hard of hearing students in universities of Turin, Italy have increased for the past 15 years. The three universities of Turin (University of Turin, Polytechnic of Turin, and Albertina Academy of Fine Arts) enroll between 25 to 35 deaf and hard of hearing students each year. They count a total of 81 deaf students at the University of Turin since 2000. Most deaf students obtain a degree in education and out of the 22 deaf students who graduated, ten received a Bachleor's degree, four completed a Masters, seven are currently enrolled in Masters degree, and only one obtained a second level Masters. Overall there is only few students in Masters degree and no PhD candidates.

In universities, interpreters are provided at some institutions to deaf signers. Deaf and hard of hearing students are also entitled to individual lesson plans and special support such as tutoring. After enrollment to a university the student has to apply for service to a Disability office and another an interview an individual plan is designed and signed by the school for the student. The office will have a set number of hours of tutoring and interpreting as well as other services the student will need. The students are assigned to a mentor that specialized in deaf and harding hearing studies and education.

Current issues with education in Italy is the drop out rate and the availability of tutorship hours. As the number of deaf students increase each year, the hours each students receives of tutorship decreases due to a reduced amount of resources for the education sector set from the national spending review policy. Out of 81 deaf students enrolled 34 students have dropped out which accounts for one third of the total enrolled. One main issue stated in the study that results in the dropout is discontinuity. Deaf students lack proper guidance in programs and switch between majors causing deaf students on average to spend more years to complete university. The study also states that while the UNCRPD wants state parties to create a universally accessible environment, universities are too focused on individual special support.

Employment 
The government requires companies of 15-35 employees to hire at least one individual with a disability. In return, employers are able to receive tax subsides, wage contributions, and reimbursement for workplace adaptations. 44% of persons with disabilities from 15 to 64 were employed in contrast to 55.1% of total population employed in the same age.

Bar Senza Nome: Only deaf owned and deaf employee worked bar in Italy. It was started in 2012 by two deaf guys, Sara and Alfonso. They obtain beer through a deaf brewer and offer LIS lessons in the store.

OneSense by Valla: Deaf owned restaurant that opened in 2018. Restaurant is also run by deaf staff and hearing cooks. The owner Valeria Olivotti wanted to create a restaurant where there are no barriers between deaf customers and workers. She wanted to show people that a restaurant with both deaf and hearing staff could work together in unity.

Healthcare 
Deaf and hard of hearing people suffer from a lack of access to healthcare and information. During the COVID-19 pandemic in Italy, the deaf community was not able to access a lot of the information provided to hearing people. Usually information is given orally or in a written format. However, in Italy LIS interpreting has only been granted for news programs. During prior press releases given by the Prime Minister, the videos were subtitled but not interpreted in LIS. The Deaf community and the ENS had to lobby and fight for interpreting services in LIS for the head of the government's releases. Although the press releases were interpreted afterwards due to the cameraman's choice of aesthetics they decided to not capture the interpreter and only focused on the Prime Minister. The deaf community protested and since then TV channels modified the interpreters windows and all meetings of the Deputy's Chamber were translated in LIS. Thus, when the Prime minister delivered speech on Coronavirus, it was also translated in LIS by two interpreters. During the lockdown in Italy, the deaf community also started using visual ICT tools to spread information to decrease the reliance on interpreting and subtitles. The spread of information during Coronavirus was due to the work of the deaf community lobbying and creating resources for each other.

Deaf people also have significant difficulties communicating with health professions due to a lack of access to sign language interpreters as well as a lack of training and awareness among professionals. A study done on a systematic review that involves a 2% sample in Italy shows the interventions that can happen in healthcare that will decrease the gap. The most essential factor to achieving equitable care for deaf people is having a sign language interpreter present. It is not clear if Italy hospitals provide interpreters or not. Cultural sensitivity and non judgemental care were also a big factor for deaf patients. Education programs and online health interventions were also identified as a way to spread information and reaching deaf people effectively. In total there were seven main interventions the studies point out. Based on the review, two major messages came out. The first is the importance of technology. The researchers believe technology can greatly improve communication between providers and patients. The second is that it is important to involve deaf communities as contributors in all steps of intervention design and implementation.

Language preservation and revitalization 
The Expanded Graded Intergenerational Disruption Scale (EGIDS) reports that LIS is stable and mid-sized with around 10,000 to 1,000,000,000 users  LIS is on a EGIDS scale of 5-6a as in the language is not being sustained by formal institutions, but it is still the norm in the home and community that all children learn and use the language.

The Italian government recognized LIS as an official language in 2021 and it is taught although the government and society leans towards oralism. LIS interpretation is also available in new reports and major government press releases and videos. Various LIS dictionaries exist. Deaf organizations such as ENS also provide LIS videos and instructions for children and adults.

See also 
 Deafness in Poland
 Deafness in France

References 

Italy